The Cotillion Coach is a miniature coach constructed in 1888 for the celebration of the 70th birthday of Christian IX of Denmark. It was later refurbished for the celebrations of the 18th birthday of Margrethe II and once again used at the 70th birthday of Queen Ingrid. It is on display in the Royal Mews and Carriage Museum at Christiansborg Palace in Copenhagen.

History

70th birthday of Christian IX
The 70th birthday of Christian IX was celebrated with a ball attended by 700 guests at Amalienborg Palace. The entertainment after dinner comprised a cotillion in the Great Hall of Christian VII's mansion. As a surprise, it opened with a procession consisting of the specially manufactured miniature coach escorted by children dressed as elves, runners and lackeys. Inside the coach was a girl dressed as an "ambassadress from a distant country". Lord chamberlain Carl Løvenskiold, who had been responsible for the planning of the ball, had also fostered the idea of the tableau and arranged for the construction of the carriage. The next day,  provided a detailed account of the event:

Later revivals
Prior to the festivities in connection with the 18th birthday of Crown Princess Margrethe on 15 April 1959, Frederik IX and Queen Ingrid had the cotillion coach refurbished. At the birthday party, it was drawn into the Knight's Hall of Frederick VIII's mansion with Princess Anne Marie sitting inside it with a wealth of cotillion coach bouquets.

For the 70th birthday of Queen Ingrid on 28 March 1980, it was decorated with flowers by florist Erik Bering. It was his first official assignment for the royal family.

At the celebration of the silver anniversary of Constantin and Anne Marie in a tent in the garden of Fredensborg Palace in 1989, their two youngest grandchildren, Princess Theodora and Prince Philippos, were given a ride in the coach which was decorated with flowers and drawn by coachmen Jens Christiansen and Erik Kofoed.

1906 Tivoli Gardens copy

In 1906, Tivoli Gardens created a copy of the Cotillion Coach for the Tivoli Guards. In 1965, it accompanied the Tivoli Guards on a visit to New York City in connection with the 1964–65 World's Fair. It was decommissioned in 2012.

See also
 Golden Coupé (Denmark)

References

External links

 Source

Danish monarchy
Christian IX of Denmark
Royal carriages
1888 works